Clifford Jackman is a Canadian lawyer and writer. He is best known for his 2015 novel The Winter Family, which was a longlisted nominee for the Scotiabank Giller Prize and a shortlisted nominee for the Governor General's Award for English-language fiction.

Born in Deep River, Ontario, Canada and raised in Ottawa, Jackman studied English literature at York University and law at Osgoode Hall Law School. He was called to the Bar of Ontario in 2009, and practices law in Guelph, Ontario.

Prior to The Winter Family, Jackman published two volumes of short stories and a mystery novel with Manor House Publishing. The Winter Family was his first book to be published by Random House of Canada.

Works
Deeper
Jackman's Cliff
The Black Box
The Winter Family (2015)
The Braver Thing (2020)

References

21st-century Canadian male writers
21st-century Canadian novelists
21st-century Canadian short story writers
Canadian male novelists
Canadian male short story writers
Canadian mystery writers
Lawyers in Ontario
Living people
Osgoode Hall Law School alumni
People from Renfrew County
Writers from Ottawa
York University alumni
Year of birth missing (living people)